Ryan Scott Lee (born October 4, 1996) is an American actor. He is best known for his role as Warren in the show Trophy Wife and as Cary in the 2011 film Super 8.
He also co-starred in the film Goosebumps as Champ, in the show My Dead Ex on go90, as well as appearing in the music video for David Guetta's "Titanium".

Early life
Lee was born in Austin, Texas, to a family of Christian background. He relocated to the United Kingdom and gained British citizenship, when he was 22. He attended the Canyon Vista Middle School.

Career
In 2011 Lee played Cary in the film Super 8, and in the same year he starred in the music video for David Guetta's song "Titanium". In the following year he played the student Joseph in Judd Apatow's This is 40. In 2015,  he also co-starred in the film Goosebumps as Champ.

Filmography

Film

Television

Music videos

Awards and nominations

References

External links

Screen Rant interview
Hollywood Reporter story
Movie Web interview

American male child actors
American male film actors
American male television actors
Living people
Male actors from Texas
21st-century American male actors
People from Austin, Texas
Year of birth missing (living people)